Dahaneh-ye Ab Dar (also Romanized as Dahaneh-ye Āb Dar; also known as Dahaneh and Dam-e Dahaneh-ye Ābdar) is a village in Meymand Rural District, in the Central District of Shahr-e Babak County, Kerman Province, Iran. At the 2006 census, its population was 47, in 10 families.

References 

Populated places in Shahr-e Babak County